Peter Maloni (born 1 December 1964) is  a former Australian rules footballer who played with Sydney in the Victorian Football League (VFL).

Notes

External links 		
		
		
		
		
		
		
Living people		
1964 births		
		
Australian rules footballers from Victoria (Australia)		
Sydney Swans players